The Skunk River Greenbelt is a public/private partnership supporting a 10 mile long trail system between Story City and Ames in central Iowa.

The trail follows the Skunk River beginning just south of Story City and ends at the McFarland Park Complex in northern Ames.  There are additional spurs to the main trail originating at the southbound I-35 Rest Stop just south of Story City, Iowa and extensive trails in McFarland Park.

Recreational opportunities include:

 Off-road biking
 Primitive campsites
 Canoeing, kayaking, and tubing along the river portion of the trail
 Public Hunting Areas
 Several Geocache
Wildlife in the area includes:

 Inhabited Beaver Pond near the northern terminus.
 Coyotes
 Wild turkeys
 Deer
 Muskrats
 Otters (rumored)
 Foxes

Sources
 Story County official website
 
Geography of Iowa
Protected areas of Story County, Iowa